HŽ series 7023 is a series of low-floor diesel multiple units for regional traffic, manufactured in KONČAR Group for the needs of Croatian Railways.

Background 
The prototype train for HŽ PP (7023 001) was built in 2016. The 7023 series is a three-piece diesel-electric low-floor set. The maximum speed of the train is 120 km/h, it has 167 seats and 175 standing places. The set is composed of two end motor cars with a control room and a middle car. It is equipped with four pairs of double doors, and it has two ramps for entering and exiting of disabled people and a space for bicycles. The seats are designed as two-seaters, except in the part of the space intended for people with reduced mobility, where folding seats are installed. Thanks to the double wide doors, a large number of passengers can get in and out quickly, and the windows are tinted 60%, as a protection from the sun. The train is equipped with the air-conditioning system and video surveillance. Passengers on the train are provided with free internet access (WiFi). Stops at official locations are announced through the passenger information system, which broadcasts messages on displays and over the public address system based on data on the train's position from the GPS device. 

These units are manufactured on the platform of the electric multiple unit 6112 series for the regional traffic. Only changes to the power supply system were made, and to the maximum extent possible, the unification of diesel-electric and electromotive trains was achieved, which resulted in significant savings in the costs of exploitation and maintenance of the entire fleet of low-floor trains. The construction, design and driving characteristics of the train allow for supreme driving comfort. Trains of this type transport daily transports passengers mostly on non-electrified regional lines across Croatia.

Main technical characteristics 
Track width: 1435 mm

Axis arrangement: Bo'2'2'Bo

Seats: 167

Floor height: 600 mm

Door width: 1300 mm

Length over clutch: 58.5 m

Vehicle width: 2885 mm

Number of doors for passenger entry: 4 (8)

Vehicle height: 4280 mm

Weight of the empty train: 115 t

Maximum power on the wheels: 3x390 kW

Traction force at start-up 120 kN

Maximum acceleration at full load: >0.7 m/s2

Maximum speed: 120 km/h

Refreneces 

Rail transport in Croatia
Trains